Meanjin is the third extended play by Australian singer-songwriter Thelma Plum, released on 12 August 2022 through Warner Music Australia. Plum has described the EP as a "love letter" to Brisbane, with Meanjin being the indigenous name for the city.

The EP's six songs were written after COVID forced Plum to leave London for Brisbane while in the middle of writing and recording her second full-length album. Returning to Brisbane, saying, "In strange times you always tend to look back at warm memories for comfort, and when I was confined to an apartment overlooking 'The Brown Snake', I found myself writing music about Meanjin, the place I grew up in and have gravitated back to." Sonically, the EP is inspired by artists Plum was listening to throughout lockdown, including Phoebe Bridgers, as well as those she had loved for years like Shania Twain and Fleetwood Mac.

The EP will be supported by an Australian tour, with special guests Graace and Jem Cassar-Daley.

At the 2022 ARIA Music Awards, the EP earned the Plum a nomination for Best Solo Artist. The EP was nominated for Best Pop Release.

Critical reception
Josh Leeson said "The '80s-inspired 'When It Rains It Pours' and 'Backseat of My Mind' are driven by gorgeous melodies and the off-kilter piano ballad 'Baby Blue Bicycle' showcases Plum's stunning vocal, as she tells the story of her childhood neighbour. At six tracks, Meanjin is short and ever so sweet. Most importantly it leaves you wanting more from Plum."

NME gave the EP a positive review, with Ellie Robinson writing: "Thelma Plum’s six-track ode to the city that shaped her is a compelling listen from start to finish, as the singer-songwriter weaves a rich and riveting tapestry of Meanjin – also known as Brisbane – with considered nods to her most formative experiences, the characters that drove them, and the local flora and fauna that coloured them."

Track listing

Charts

Release history

References

2022 EPs
Thelma Plum albums
Warner Music Australasia albums